Arwi or ArabuTamil (Arabic:  ,) is an Arabic influenced dialect of the Tamil language written with an extension of the Arabic alphabet, with extensive lexical and phonetic influences from the Arabic language. Arwi was used extensively by the Muslim minority of the Tamil Nadu state of India and Sri Lanka.

History 
 

Arwi was an outcome of the cultural synthesis between seafaring Arabs and Tamil-speaking Muslims of Tamil Nadu. This language was enriched, promoted and developed in Kayalpattinam. It had a rich body of work in jurisprudence, Sufism, law, medicine and sexology, of which little has been preserved. It was used as a bridge language for Tamil Muslims to learn Arabic. The patrons of Arwi seem to have been the Nawab of the Carnatic, they were Islamic and were part of the Mughal Empire. Many hadith manuscripts have been found. Most of the fiqh books, particularly those of Imaam Shaafi and Imaam Abu Hanifa, have been found in Arwi. 

There was also a translation of the Bible into Arwi in 1926. 

Arwi still has a place among the more traditional Tamil Muslim (Arwi Muslim) and Sri Lankan Moor families.

Script 

The Arwi alphabet is the Arabic alphabet, with thirteen additional letters used to represent the Tamil vowels e and o and several Tamil consonants that could not be mapped to Arabic sounds.

See also 
 Jawi Alphabets
 Swahili language
 Arabi Malayalam
 Arabic Script

References 

 Shu’ayb, Tayka. Arabic, Arwi and Persian in Sarandib and Tamil Nadu. Madras: Imāmul 'Arūs Trust, 1993.
 Yunush Ahamed Mohamed Sherif ARABUTTAMIL/ARWI: THE IDENTITY OF THE TAMIL MUSLIMS TJPRC Publication.
 Dr. K. M. A. Ahamed Zubair. The Rise and Decline of Arabu–Tamil Language for Tamil Muslims IIUC STUDIES, 2014
 DR. S.M.M Mazahir. அறபுத் தமிழும் அறபுத்தமிழ் ஆக்கங்களும் 2018

External links 
 Arwi: Comments, Questions and Answers
 Islamic Cultural Values of Arwi Southeastern university of Sri Lanka. Research and publication (2014).
 For a cultural synthesis Book review in The Hindu
 Arwi or Arabu-Tamil Book on Arwi
 What is Arwi (Arabic Tamil)?
 Arwi (அரபுத்தமிழ் / لسانالأروي)
 'Arusi branch of the Qadiri path

Tamil dialects
Arabic alphabets
Sri Lankan Moors
Arabic alphabets for South Asian languages